Anatoma tobeyoides is a species of sea snail, a marine gastropod mollusk in the family Anatomidae. It is named for the painter Mark Tobey.

Description
The shell grows to a height of 1.5 mm.

Distribution
This marine species occurs off Queensland, East South Australia and off Tasmania

References

 Geiger D.L. & Jansen P. 2004. Revision of the Australian species of Anatomidae (Mollusca: Gastropoda: Vetigastropoda). Zootaxa 415 : 1–35
 Geiger D.L. (2012) Monograph of the little slit shells. Volume 1. Introduction, Scissurellidae. pp. 1–728. Volume 2. Anatomidae, Larocheidae, Depressizonidae, Sutilizonidae, Temnocinclidae. pp. 729–1291. Santa Barbara Museum of Natural History Monographs Number 7

External links
 

Anatomidae
Gastropods described in 2004